The 1991 AFL Grand Final was an Australian rules football game contested between the  Hawthorn Football Club and West Coast Eagles, held at Waverley Park in Melbourne on 28 September 1991. It was the 94th annual Grand Final of the Australian Football League (formerly the Victorian Football League), staged to determine the premiers for the 1991 AFL season. The match, attended 75,230 spectators, was won by Hawthorn by a margin of 53 points, marking that club's ninth premiership victory.

Reconstruction work at the larger Melbourne Cricket Ground, where most Grand Finals had been played since 1902, meant that the game was played at Waverley Park, marking the first and only time that this stadium hosted a premiership decider. The match was also the first Grand Final to feature a team (West Coast) based outside the state of Victoria.

Background

Hawthorn had played the Grand Final in seven of the previous eight seasons, having most recently won the 1989 VFL Grand Final, while West Coast was playing in its first Grand Final ever, having entered the competition just four years previously. The Eagles came into the game as strong favourites, having played through the entire 1991 season as the leading team in the competition in which they won their first 12 games and finished three games clear on top of the ladder with a 19-3 record, earning their first McClelland Trophy. Hawthorn had finished second with a record of 16 wins and 6 losses. Though starting the season slowly, losing five of their first 11 games, they lost just one more game for the rest of the home and away season. The Eagles defeated the Hawks in both their home-and-away encounters during the season, by 82 points at Princes Park in round 7 and 24 points at Subiaco Oval in round 22.

In the lead-up to the Grand Final, Hawthorn defeated West Coast by 23 points at Subiaco the Qualifying Final. The Eagles subsequently defeated  by 38 points in the First Semi-Final, while Hawthorn defeated Geelong by two points in the Second Semi-Final, sending the Hawks to the Grand Final. The Eagles defeated Geelong by 15 points in the Preliminary Final to take their place in the premiership decider.

Teams

Match summary
The game was played with what appeared as a four-goal breeze towards the main scoreboard end. Eagles captain John Worsfold won the toss and kicked with the wind.

First quarter
The ball moved up and down the field before the first of two 50-metre penalties conceded by Langford allowing Sumich to kick the first goal after ten minutes. A second penalty by Langford after a Sumich mark gave Sumich his second goal. A snap from Wilson in the pocket followed by a relay free kick to Heady stretched the margin out to four goals. A minute later Paul Dear ran into an open goal to give the Hawks their first. After the Hawks scored four behinds Sumich marked and kicked his third goal from outside 60 metres. Jason Dunstall scored a goal from a Ben Allan centreline clearance, then again Dunstall scored his second for the term from a free kick on the siren. The Eagles' lead was nine points at the first change.

Second quarter
With Hawthorn now kicking with the breeze, Dear marked consecutive kick ins and started dominating at Centre Half Forward. Goals to Dear and Darrin Pritchard saw the Hawks take the lead. After a couple more behinds from the Hawks, Tony Hall snapped a goal and the Hawthorn lead was fourteen points. Paul Hudson added the Hawks' sixth unanswered goal before the Eagles, through Sumich and Chris Lewis, reduced the Hawks' lead to ten points at the main break.

Third quarter
Both teams went goal for goal in this term, and the margin at three-quarter time was still ten points in Hawthorn's favour. Hawthorn had Stephen Lawrence winning the hit outs, and a dominating midfield negated any wind assistance the Eagles may have had. Heady kicked three goals for the quarter and Hawthorn's Dermott Brereton two.

Final quarter
The Hawks blew the game open in the final term, kicking eight goals to one. Brereton took two marks in the goal square in the first three minutes to put the Hawks 23 points ahead. Fatigue was now taking its toll on the Eagles, and four later goals to Dunstall and one to Sumich saw the Hawks win by 53 points.

The Norm Smith Medal was awarded to Hawthorn's Paul Dear for his workmanlike performance, especially in the tight first half. After the Eagles had started well, Dear was shifted to the half-forward line and not only kicked Hawthorn's first goal, but managed to quell the influence of Andrew Lockyer and Glen Jakovich by providing a foil for Dermott Brereton. He also backed up in the ruck when Stephen Lawrence had to be rested. Dear ended up with 18 kicks, eight handpasses and eight marks - 11 of those disposals and six of those marks came in the second quarter.

Postscript

West Coast coach Michael Malthouse said after the game that "Hawthorn had been first to the ball and clearly won in the air".

Hawthorn's experience was seen as the decisive factor in their victory, and sparked a new club T-shirt: "Too old. Too slow. Too good." (Some commentators had previously thought the Hawks were 'too old and too slow' to ever win another premiership.) Hawthorn defender Gary Ayres made sarcastic reference to this in his post-match interview.

By failing to win the Grand Final, West Coast tied the record for the most home and away wins by a non-Premier (matching the record of 19 wins set by Collingwood in 1973). This record was subsequently broken by Geelong in 2008.

Hawthorn's flag closed a period in which the club won five premierships in nine years. The game also represented the final game of VFL/AFL football played by Michael Tuck. His record includes
 Most premierships by a player: 7
 Most Grand finals by a player: 11 
 Most finals by a player: 39
 Oldest Premiership player: 38 years, 95 days.

Game day entertainment
The day was also memorable for the half-time entertainment which featured a parade of sporting celebrities in Ford Capris to celebrate the upcoming 1992 Barcelona Olympics. Included in the parade were the 1991 Brownlow medallist Jim Stynes, the Oarsome Foursome, Jeff Fenech, Fighting Harada, Lionel Rose, Lisa Ondieki and her husband Yobes, and Susie Maroney. Champion marathon runner and then Head of the AIS Robert de Castella and rock singer Angry Anderson were transported to the middle of the ground in a blue Batmobile-like vehicle with the AFL logo prominently displayed. De Castella gave a brief speech honouring Australia's Olympians and other sporting heroes before Anderson jumped from the Batmobile and took centre stage, belting out his hit song "Bound for Glory" and encouraging the crowd to sing along. Anderson's performance has since become the subject of derision. and footage of the performance featured in a 2008 Carlton and United Breweries satirical television advertisement, with the caption stating that "CUB is a proud supporter of AFL footy since 1877 (except for 1991)".

Scorecard

See also
2015 AFL Grand Final

References

Bibliography

External links
Match details at AFL Tables
 

VFL/AFL Grand Finals
1991 Australian Football League season
Afl Grand Final, 1991
Hawthorn Football Club
West Coast Eagles